White box may refer to:

White-box testing, a specification conformance test
White box (computer hardware), a personal computer assembled from off-the-shelf parts
White box (software engineering), a subsystem whose internals can be viewed
White-box cryptography, a cryptographic system designed to be secure even when its internals are viewed
Whitebox GAT, an advanced open-source and cross-platform GIS & remote sensing software package
WHITEbox, an album set by Sunn O)))
"White Box", the title of a special Christmas episode in Series 5 of Absolutely Fabulous
White box system, a bilge water monitoring and control system for ships
The "white box" release of the original Dungeons & Dragons rules
White Box, Eucalyptus albens, a tree species from Australia
Shirobako (lit. White Box), an anime television series produced by P.A.Works
WhiteBox (art center), an arts center in New York City, United States

See also
 White cube gallery
 White goods